APAH may refer to the following Advanced Placement high school courses:
 AP Art History
 AP United States History (often called AP American History)